The New Philadelphia Red Birds were a minor league baseball team based in New Philadelphia, Ohio. In 1936, the New Philadelphia Red Birds played briefly as members of the Class D level Ohio State League, as a minor league affiliate of the St. Louis Cardinals.

History
The New Philadelphia Red Birds began minor league baseball play in 1936 as members of the six–team Class D level Ohio State League. The "Red Birds" moniker reflected the franchise as an affiliate of the St. Louis Cardinals. The charter Ohio State League members in 1936 were the Fostoria Cardinals, Fremont Reds, Mansfield Tigers, New Philadelphia Red Birds, Sandusky Sailors and Tiffin Mud Hens. 

Beginning play in the 1936 Ohio State League, the New Philadelphia franchise had a short existence. After beginning play, the team had a 2–6 record when the New Philadelphia Red Birds folded on May 26, 1936. The New Philadelphia manager was George Silvey. After New Philadelphia folded, Silvey moved to manage the 1936 Fostoria Cardinals, who became a St. Louis Cardinals affiliate.

New Philadelphia, Ohio has not hosted another minor league team.

Ballpark
The name of the New Philadelphia Red Birds' home minor league ballpark is not directly referenced. Tuscora Park in New Philadelphia was in existence as a public park with ballfields during the era. Still in use today with the Waterworks Ball Fields, vintage amusement rides and public amenities, Tuscora Park is located at 161 Tuscora Avenue, New Philadelphia, Ohio.

Year-by-year record

Notable alumni
No alumni of the New Philadelphia Red Birds reached the major leagues.

References

External links
Baseball Reference

Defunct minor league baseball teams
Professional baseball teams in Ohio
Defunct baseball teams in Ohio
Baseball teams established in 1936
Baseball teams disestablished in 1936
St. Louis Cardinals minor league affiliates
Tuscarawas County, Ohio
Ohio State League teams